is a Japanese professional golfer. She plays on the LPGA of Japan Tour where she was won twice.

Professional wins (2)

LPGA of Japan Tour wins (2)

References

External links 

Japanese female golfers
LPGA of Japan Tour golfers
1998 births
Living people
21st-century Japanese women